"Canzone per te" ("A song for you"), written by Italian composer Sergio Endrigo and sung by Brazilian singer Roberto Carlos, was the Italian entrant to and winner of the 1968 edition of the Sanremo Music Festival.

On the night of the contest, held in Sanremo, Italy, the song was performed by both Endrigo and Carlos.

Cover 
The piece has been the subject of numerous reinterpretations by other artists. In 1968 Mina recorded her own version in Italian and one in Spanish and in the same year Giorgio Carnini performed an instrumental version for his album Giorgio Carnini on the Hammond X-66 organ, also published in Turkey and Venezuela. Also in 1968 the Los Catinos group performed a Spanish version entitled Canción para tí, included in the 1991 album Canciones románticas.

In 1974 the Portuguese singer Amália Rodrigues performed it in Italian for her album Amalia in Italy. Other engravings in Italian were later made by Ornella Vanoni, Claudio Baglioni and Gianni Morandi. In 1989 Enrico Ruggeri recorded the song on his album Contacts; later, in a concert by him in 2005, he praised Endrigo by performing the piece. In 1992 George Dalaras with Haris & Panos Katsimihas recorded a version of it on the LP Iparhi logos.

In 2003 Orietta Berti recorded a version of her by publishing it in her album Emotion of the author. Elisa interpreted the piece at the Sanremo Festival 2010, to honor the Italian song in the world in the dedicated evening. Simone Cristicchi proposes it at the Sanremo Festival 2013, in the "Sanremo Story" evening dedicated to the songs presented in the past at the event.

Recordings
Sergio Franchi recorded an English-language version of this song ("I Wrote a Song For You") on his 1968 RCA Victor album Wine and Song.

References

Italian-language songs
Sanremo Music Festival songs
Songs written by Sergio Endrigo